Iced Earth is the debut studio album by American heavy metal band Iced Earth. It was released in November 1990 internationally and February 1991 in North America. The album has three different covers (a European/Japanese cover, an American cover and a remastered cover). This album was Mike McGill's only album with Iced Earth, as well as the last for singer Gene Adam.

Iced Earth's first three albums (this album, Night of the Stormrider, and Burnt Offerings) were remastered in 2001, and each had a new cover.

Track listing
All lyrics written by Jon Schaffer and all music written by Schaffer and Randall Shawver, except where noted.

Personnel
Gene Adam − lead vocals
Randall Shawver − lead guitar
Jon Schaffer − rhythm guitar, backing vocals
Dave Abell − bass
Mike McGill − drums

References

1990 debut albums
Iced Earth albums
Century Media Records albums
Albums recorded at Morrisound Recording